Sir John Milne Barbour, 1st Baronet JP, DL (1868 – 3 October 1951) was a Northern Irish politician and baronet. As a member of the Privy Council of Northern Ireland he was styled The Right Honourable Sir Milne Barbour.

Background and education
Born at The Fort in Lisburn, County Antrim, he was the son of John Doherty Barbour a mill owner, and Elizabeth Law Milling. He was educated at Elstree School, Harrow School, Brasenose College, Oxford, and Darmstadt, Germany. The members of his family were wealthy linen manufacturers, owners of William Barbour Linen Thread Company of Hilden – the largest linen thread manufacturers in the world, in business he was Chairman of the family company, which exists today in the same factory as Barbour Campbell Threads.

Career
In politics, he served as a member of parliament for County Antrim from 1921–1929 and then for South Antrim from 1929 until his death in 1951. In 1921, he was appointed Parliamentary and Financial Secretary to the Ministry of Finance, and then entered Craigavon's Cabinet as Minister of Commerce in 1937 (where he was perceived as "wrong, inept and palsied") and was promoted, aged 72, to Minister of Finance.

He also acted as High Sheriff of Armagh in 1905 and as High Sheriff of Down in 1907. He was created a baronet, of Hilden, in the County of Antrim, on 17 August 1943. He also served as President of the Belfast Chamber of Commerce in 1911, as a member of Belfast Harbour Commissioners from 1914 to 1950, as President of the Royal Victoria Hospital, Belfast and as president of the Royal Ulster Agricultural Society from 1925 to 1930 and from 1931 until his death. He also sat on the Senate of Queen's University, Belfast.

Personal life
Barbour married Elise Barbour, a distant relative (b. Paterson, New Jersey, USA in 1873); Lady Barbour died at their home, Conway House, Dunmurry, in 1910. The couple had three daughters and one son, John Milne Jnr., whose aeroplane went missing whilst flying over the Irish sea in 1937. John was a civilian pilot (a former competitor in the King's Cup Race) who would fly home at the weekends from the Barbour factory in Glasgow, where he worked during the week. Barbour's sister, Helen, married Thomas Andrews, architect of the Titanic. Barbour was a Freemason. He was described by diarist Lillian Dean, later Lady Spender (wife of Sir Wilfrid Spender) as "a curious man who looks like a stage Mephistopheles but is given to preaching in dissenting chapels." A deeply religious man throughout his life he served on as a Member of the General Synod of the Church of Ireland. presented the East Window to Christ Church Cathedral, Lisburn, in memory of his wife and son. The baronetcy became extinct upon his death, Barbour was predeceased by his son.

Barbour Memorial Playing Fields and the Sir Milne Barbour Memorial Garden, both in Lisburn, are named in his honour. A prize cup at the boat club of Queen's University, Belfast is also named in his honour.

Arms

See also
Summary of a piece of film held in the Public Records Office NI Digital Film Archive which features Sir Milne
A motor car made for Sir Milne (in Spanish)

References

1868 births
1951 deaths
Alumni of Brasenose College, Oxford
Baronets in the Baronetage of the United Kingdom
Deputy Lieutenants in Northern Ireland
High Sheriffs of Armagh
High Sheriffs of Down
Linen industry in Ireland
Members of the House of Commons of Northern Ireland 1921–1925
Members of the House of Commons of Northern Ireland 1925–1929
Members of the House of Commons of Northern Ireland 1929–1933
Members of the House of Commons of Northern Ireland 1933–1938
Members of the House of Commons of Northern Ireland 1938–1945
Members of the House of Commons of Northern Ireland 1945–1949
Members of the House of Commons of Northern Ireland 1949–1953
Members of the Privy Council of Northern Ireland
Northern Ireland Cabinet ministers (Parliament of Northern Ireland)
Anglicans from Northern Ireland
People educated at Elstree School
People educated at Harrow School
People from Lisburn
Ulster Unionist Party members of the House of Commons of Northern Ireland
Ministers of Finance of Northern Ireland
Members of the House of Commons of Northern Ireland for County Antrim constituencies
Politicians from County Antrim
High Sheriffs of Antrim